Kim Tae-young (born January 17, 1982) is a South Korean professional footballer playing for Ang Thong. On November 9, 2008, he scored K-League's historic 10,000th goal against his own net.

References

External links
 

1982 births
Living people
People from Gyeonggi Province
Sportspeople from Gyeonggi Province
People from Anyang, Gyeonggi
Association football defenders
South Korean footballers
South Korean expatriate footballers
Jeonbuk Hyundai Motors players
Busan IPark players
K League 1 players
K3 League players
Konkuk University alumni
Expatriate footballers in Thailand
South Korean expatriate sportspeople in Thailand